Amaranth oil is extracted from the seeds of two species of the genus Amaranthus — A. cruentus and A. hypochondriacus — that are called, collectively, amaranth grain.

Amaranth oil is a light-to-medium-colored, clear liquid that is pourable at low temperatures. It is a source of fatty acids, with oleic acid, linoleic acid, and palmitic acid having the highest proportions. The oil is valued for its ability to add temperature stability at both high and low temperatures. Commercial uses of amaranth oil include foods, cosmetics, shampoos, and intermediates for manufacture of lubricants, pharmaceuticals, rubber chemicals, aromatics, and surface active agents. As a food oil, amaranth oil has a delicate taste. The oil content of the actual amaranth grain ranges from 4.8 to 8.1%, which is relatively low compared to other sources of seed oil.

Chemically, the major constituents of amaranth oil are:

{| class="wikitable"
! Fatty acid !! Content
|-
| Linoleic acid || align="right" | 50%
|-
| Oleic acid|| align="right" | 23%
|-
| Palmitic acid || align="right" | 19%
|-
|| Stearic acid || align="right" | 3%
|}

References 

Cooking oils
Vegetable oils
Amaranthus